Francisco Rueda (born 20 August 1958) is a Mexican diver. He competed in two events at the 1980 Summer Olympics.

References

1958 births
Living people
Mexican male divers
Olympic divers of Mexico
Divers at the 1980 Summer Olympics
Place of birth missing (living people)